The Most Faithful Order of Perwira Agong Negara Brunei, also translated as The Most Faithful Order of Gallantry of Brunei, is an order of Brunei. It was established on 28 November 1959 by Sultan Omar Ali Saifuddien III.

The order consists of two classes:

Recipients

First Class 

 1966 – Major General Husin – Commander of the Royal Brunei Armed Forces

References 

Orders, decorations, and medals of Brunei
Awards established in 1959
1959 establishments in Brunei